Alfred Schoebel (14 May 1911 – 16 October 2000) was a French swimmer. He competed in the men's 200 metre breaststroke at the 1932 Summer Olympics.

References

External links
 

1911 births
2000 deaths
French male breaststroke swimmers
Olympic swimmers of France
Swimmers at the 1932 Summer Olympics
Sportspeople from Strasbourg